The Lausanne derailment of 1994 took place in July 1994 in the Swiss city of Lausanne.

15 tank wagons were derailed, and chemicals spilled.

Details 

 Train length = 690 m
 Wagons = 50 wagons 
 Axles = 130
 Tonnes = 1753 tonnes

See also 

 French

References

External links 

Derailments in Switzerland
Railway accidents in 1994
Transport in Lausanne
1994 disasters in Switzerland